Flint is an unincorporated community in southeastern Smith County, Texas, United States.  It lies along FM 2493 south of the city of Tyler, the county seat of Smith County.  Its elevation is 522 feet (159 m).  Although Flint is unincorporated, it has a post office, with the ZIP code of 75762.

History

The town was named for Robert P. Flynt, a local landowner but the post office began operations in 1887 under the spelling "Flint" when postmaster Charles B. Brown misspelled the name on application forms.

Climate
Flint is considered to be part of the humid subtropical region.

Notable people
William Clark Green, Country singer and guitarist

References

Unincorporated communities in Smith County, Texas
Unincorporated communities in Texas